Yannik Cudjoe-Virgil (born November 28, 1992) is a former American football outside linebacker for National Football League (NFL). He played college football at the University of Maryland College Park where he was a pre-season selection in 2014 for the Butkus Award as the best Linebacker in college football. As of 2019 he was working in real estate.

Early years
Cudjoe-Virgil attended and played high school football at Towson High School.

College career

Seton Hill University

Freshman season (2010)

As a freshman at Seton Hill University, he played in 10 of 11 games and posted 14 tackles on the year. He contributed on special teams.

Sophomore season (2011)

As a sophomore he was elected team captain in the spring. Played all 11 games at Defensive End. Posted 44 tackles, including 8 tackles for loss and 5 sacks. Currently holds the single season school record for blocked kicks in a season (6)  including a record of two in one game.

Maryland

Junior season (2012)

As a junior, he transferred to the University of Maryland College Park and joined the team as a walk-on  where he redshirted

due to NCAA transfer rules. Earned a scholarship prior to the 2013 season.

Redshirt junior season (2013)

As a redshirt junior he was elected team captain. Cudjoe-Virgil made his Maryland debut against FIU (8/31) before making his first career start and notching a sack against Old Dominion (9/7). He tailed 7 tackles, 2.5 sacks and 3 tackles for loss against Connecticut

(9/14). Cudjoe-Virgil recorded his first interception against West Virginia (9/21). After 6 games he suffered a season-ending injury (torn pectoral muscle).

Redshirt senior season (2014)

As a redshirt senior he was one of 51 selected in the preseason for the Butkus Award watch list for the best linebacker in college football.

Elected team captain, Cudjoe-Virgil suffered a foot injury during training camp and missed the first 3 regular season games.

He appeared in 9 games and recorded 2 sacks and 2.5 TFL. After his redshirt senior season, Cudjoe-Virgil entered the 2015 NFL Draft.

Professional career 
Cudjoe-Virgil was selected to participate in the 2015 NFL Combine. He was unable to participate due to injury. He bench pressed 225 lbs 25 times. At pro-day, he was clocked in at 4.5 to 4.6 in the 40 yard dash by NFL scouts.

Tennessee Titans

2015 season

The Tennessee Titans signed Cudjoe-Virgil after the 2015 NFL Draft to a 3-year 1.56M contract. After a strong mini-camp by national writers, he appeared in his first preseason game against the Atlanta Falcons on August 14, 2015. He suffered a torn hamstring and was placed on injured reserve. Cudjoe-Virgil made his debut for the Tennessee Titans week 12 on November 29, 2015. In week 14 he suffered a season ending torn patella tendon. He was placed on Injured Reserve for the remaining season.

2016 season

Cudjoe-Virgil suffered a re-tear of his torn patella tendon during rehabilitation and missed all of the 2016 season. He was released by the Tennessee Titans prior to the 2016 season.

2017 season

After complications from surgery, Cudjoe-Virgil retired in 2017.

Personal life
Cudjoe-Virgil was a commercial real estate investor as of 2019.

References

1992 births
Living people
American football linebackers
Maryland Terrapins football players
Tennessee Titans players
Trinidad and Tobago players of American football
Trinidad and Tobago expatriate sportspeople in the United States